Heinrich Glasmeyer (April 4, 1893 – January 2, 1974) was a German politician of the Christian Democratic Union (CDU) and former member of the German Bundestag.

Life 
In the 1949 federal elections he became a member of the Bundestag via the North Rhine-Westphalia state list for the Centre Party. He was a full member of the Committee for the Protection of the Constitution, the Committee for Equalization of Burdens and the Committee for ERP Issues. On 23 November 1951 he left the parliamentary group of the Centre Party and joined the CDU, for which he entered parliament in the 1953 federal elections, also via the North Rhine-Westphalia state list.

Literature

References

1893 births
1974 deaths
Members of the Bundestag for North Rhine-Westphalia
Members of the Bundestag 1953–1957
Members of the Bundestag 1949–1953
Members of the Bundestag for the Christian Democratic Union of Germany